Moumoukai Peak is a mountain situated on Raoul Island.

Mountains of the New Zealand outlying islands
Landforms of the Kermadec Islands
Raoul Island